Polyacanthonotus is a genus of spiny eels, with these currently recognized species:
 Polyacanthonotus africanus (Gilchrist & von Bonde, 1924) 
 Polyacanthonotus challengeri (Vaillant, 1888) (longnose tapirfish)
 Polyacanthonotus merretti Sulak, R. E. Crabtree & Hureau, 1984 (Bahamas spiny eel) 
 Polyacanthonotus rissoanus (De Filippi & Vérany, 1857) (smallmouth spiny eel)

References 

Notacanthidae